is a Japanese novel series written by Chiaki Kisaki and illustrated by Hako Ichiiro. ASCII Media Works have published nine volumes since 2014 under their Media Works Bunko imprint. The novel won the Grand Prize at the 20th annual Dengeki Novel Awards.

A manga adaptation with art by Kisara Akino was serialized in Square Enix's shōnen manga magazine G Fantasy between July 2016 and May 2017. It was collected in two tankōbon volumes. A second manga adaptation titled Hakata Tonkotsu Ramens Dai 2-Shō, with art by Chiako Nagaoka, was launched on August 18, 2017 in the same magazine. It was collected in two tankōbon volumes.

An anime television series adaptation by Satelight aired from January 12 to March 30, 2018.

Characters

A detective who runs his own agency called the Banba Detective Office. Born and raised in Hakata, he loves Tonkotsu ramen, Mentaiko, and baseball. He is also the identity of the famous assassin known as The Niwaka Samurai.

A crossdressing hitman from Kunming, China. He is skilled with the knife. He came to Japan to look for his sister and to pay off a large debt incurred by his family. After finding out his sister was murdered by the very agency he worked for, he teamed up with Banba to kill them and joins him afterwards. His real name is Maomei, and he sold himself to help his family's poor financial situation. He would undergo brutal training to become an assassin for five years with the help of his roommate Feilang, who ended up betraying him during the final exam.

A former baseball player who was kicked off the team for severely injuring a fellow player during a pitch. He becomes a contractor for Murder Inc. He is a new employee having recently moved from Tokyo to Hakata.

A skilled computer hacker who runs an information shop. He and Banba have a longstanding working relationship. He uses mechanical spiders as tracking devices to discreetly pick up information. His real name is Chihiro Matsuda (松田 千尋) and he is the son of Kazuo Matsuda, a member of Japan's House of Representatives. He was caught hacking and his father ordered his butler Yagi fake his death by sending him away to Hakata to allow him to live freely. He would dye his hair and assume the name of Enokida to cover his true identity.

A former hairdresser who runs his own hitman agency. He moved to Hakata after his lover was murdered to start his own agency, and has been Misaki's caretaker.

An elementary school student who assists Jiro in running his agency. 

A torturer who immigrated from the Dominican Republic. 

A host who works for the club Adam.

Director of a cosmetic surgery clinic.

A veteran detective who has a great working relationship with Banba. He investigates incidents that are not judged by the law.

A chef who works at a ramen stand that Banba frequently dines at. He is a former hitman nicknamed G.G (Ji-Ji) who was the strongest in Hakata.

A hitman who formerly worked for Murder Inc. He is a submarine-style pitcher for a rival baseball team and he fights by throwing shurikens and other projectiles in the same manner. He was ace of Murder Inc, but he left Murder Inc and return to Kitakyushu where is his home. because he was fed up with the boring assignments he keeps on getting and want to fight a stronger opponent. With his new employer, he is assigned to kill the Nikawa Samurai and is determined to do it on his own terms. As such, he develops a rivalry with Banba and will help him out when he is threatened not wanting anybody else to kill him.

A consultant who investigates child murders in Kitakyushu. He used to play baseball as Saruwatari's catcher, and as such he has a close relationship with him.

A hitman from Beijing who was Lin's training partner. He provided emotional support for Lin while at the assassin training grounds in China. However, he ends up betraying him at the final exam where the two had to fight to the death when he revealed that he killed his previous roommate. Lin apparently killed him to pass the exam, but he survived and has since made a living as a hitman in Beijing.

Media

Novel

Light novel

Durarara!! × Hakata Tonkotsu Ramens

Manga

Hakata Tonkotsu Ramens Dai 2-Shō

Anime
An anime television series adaptation by Satelight aired from January 12 to March 30, 2018, as part of Dengeki's 25th anniversary. Crunchyroll simulcasted the series, while Funimation produced an English dub.

Stage play
A stage play adaptation premiered from July 13 to July 21, 2019.

Reception

Previews
The anime adaptation's first episode garnered mixed reviews from Anime News Network's staff during the Winter 2018 season previews. Chris Farris solely reviewed the English dub version of the episode, criticizing the premise for lacking "punch and personality" to sell itself and felt the voice actors were "monotone" and weren't "distinct" enough with their performances (singling out Daman Mills' portrayal of Xianming as a standout), concluding that: "Ultimately, listening to this paradox just creates a feeling of surreal blandness." James Beckett found it to be a "dour premiere" that's "decent-looking" but lacks ambition and excitement to deliver its hitmen ensemble and their various storylines throughout the overall plot. Lynzee Loveridge found the production "middle of the road" but commended the crossdressing character of Xianming and was intrigued by the "interwoven threads" and "interlocking relationships" throughout the overall mystery. Jacob Chapman commended the handling of the Ryōgo Narita-like "multitudinous subplots" that connect with each other but was critical of the serious tone clashing with the ridiculous setup, the cast of "blasé and unlikable characters" and the production having a "mediocre art design" and "stiff animation", concluding that: "Hakata Tonkotsu Ramens isn't a traditionally terrible show, but I don't think its lukewarm stabs at uniqueness made it any less of a slog to get through either." Rebecca Silverman wrote that: "With a jazz-based soundtrack and a casual feeling about it, Hakata Tonkotsu Ramens stands to be an interesting puzzle to piece together. It's definitely going to be worth figuring out where it's headed, because there are a few directions it could take as of now." Nick Creamer was critical of the mediocre aesthetic quality throughout the art and character designs, but gave praise to the natural transitions between characters and subplots, saying "[I]f you're looking for a convoluted crime drama, you could certainly do a lot worse." Theron Martin praised director Kenji Yasuda for handling the concept by having a "well-organized" plot and an ensemble cast that gets equal attention and sets up various scenarios between them, calling it "one of the season's sharper new entries so far."

Series reception
Martin reviewed the complete anime series and gave it a B+ grade. While giving note of some "distasteful story elements" and a lack of female representation in its ensemble, he praised the charm of its cast and their interactions with each other throughout the series and the production's "distinctive aesthetic" that gives them their visual appeal, concluding that: "If you can handle its graphic content, then Hakata Tonkotsu Ramens is a highly entertaining series that may have been overlooked during the Winter 2018 season, but is well worth checking out for fans of its unique sub-genre." Silverman reviewed the home video release in 2019 and gave it an overall B grade. She praised Lin's character development during the first and last arcs, the use of language and the balancing of both humor and dark elements, but was critical of how the show treats its female characters and the rest of the cast being just "one-note" quirky personalities, concluding that: "Although it can feel a bit uneven over the course of its four story arcs, Hakata Tonkotsu Ramens is a fun show overall."

Notes

References

External links
  
 

2014 Japanese novels
Anime and manga based on novels
AT-X (TV network) original programming
Book series introduced in 2014
Crunchyroll anime
Funimation
Gangan Comics manga
Kadokawa Dwango franchises
Media Works Bunko
Muse Communication
Novel series
Organized crime in anime and manga
Satelight
Shōnen manga
Television shows set in Japan